Guanella is an Italian surname. Notable people with the surname include:

Gustav Guanella (1909–1982), Swiss inventor
Luigi Guanella (1842–1915), Italian Roman Catholic priest

See also
Guanella Pass, a mountain pass of Colorado, United States

Italian-language surnames